Słomniki  is a town in southern Poland, situated in the Lesser Poland Voivodeship (since 1999), previously in Kraków Voivodeship (1975–1998). On December 31, 2010, its population was 4,365, and the town is a center of commerce and services for the local agricultural area. Its name probably comes from a Medieval guild called szłomiarze or szłomniki, who manufactured helmets for royal knights.

The town has two rail stations (Słomniki and Słomniki Miasto), on a major electrified double track railway from Kraków to Warsaw. Słomniki is also served by the Kraków Transit Authority (MPK Kraków), with bus line 222 reaching it from Nowa Huta. The town has several schools, house of culture, cinema, library and Museum of Słomniki Land. Its sports club KS Słomniczanka was founded in 1923, and currently has football and volleyball departments.

History
The village of Słomniki was first mentioned in 1287, as a hunting settlement in the middle of dense forests. At that time, it belonged to Cistercian monks, and was located along a merchant route from Bochnia and Wieliczka to Greater Poland. In the 13th century, Lesser Poland suffered from several Mongol raids (see Mongol invasion of Poland), in which Słomniki was also destroyed. In 1358 King Kazimierz Wielki granted Słomniki Magdeburg rights charter, and medieval style market square was fashioned, which still exists. The town developed, and several Polish rulers visited it in the 15th and 16th centuries. In 1554, Słomniki became one of main centers of Protestant Reformation, when a Calvinist temple was opened here. In 1564, the Polish Reformed Church synod took place in Słomniki. Like most towns in Lesser Poland, Słomniki was completely destroyed in the Swedish invasion of Poland, and the period of prosperity ended.

During the Kościuszko Uprising, Polish units gathered in Słomniki after the Battle of Racławice. On April 6, 1794, at Słomniki market square, Józef Zajączek and Antoni Madaliński were promoted to the rank of general. After the Partitions of Poland, Słomniki briefly belonged to the Habsburg Empire, and since 1815, it was part of Russian-controlled Congress Poland. The town was a major center of the January Uprising, for which it was stripped of its charter (1870), remaining a village until 1917. In the interwar period (1918–1939), Słomniki belonged to Kielce Voivodeship.

Major attraction of the town is Romanesque Revival Corpus Christi church (1888–1893).

External links
 Jewish Community in Słomniki on Virtual Shtetl

Cities and towns in Lesser Poland Voivodeship
Kraków County
Kraków Voivodeship (14th century – 1795)
Kielce Governorate
Kielce Voivodeship (1919–1939)